The Super Flying Fun Show was a live weekday morning television programme aimed at children.  It was made at TCN 9 in Sydney, Australia, and shown on relay in Melbourne on GTV 9.

Super Flying Fun Show replaced the original Today show that had been launched from GTV 9 in 1968 with Mike Walsh. When Today was linked with TCN 9 and the compere changed to Tony Charlton, recently recruited Victorian regional stations began to drop the show. By October 1969 the Today show had been cancelled, and a mixture of live children's entertainment and cartoons was on air between 7AM and 8:30AM and later to 9:00AM beginning in early March 1970.

Original hosts were Miss Marilyn (Marilyn Mayo) and comedian Rod Hull with his puppet creation, Emu. Opening titles consisted of Rod Hull as the character Caretaker Clot (Clotty the Janitor) walking to the TCN 9 transmitter tower and flicking a big switch. Clot was also a popular police officer character in the channel's Kaper Kops, a local homage to The Keystone Cops. Its director, Stefan Sargent, claimed this show was a "direct steal of the American Keystone Kops". 

When Hull returned to England in 1971, taking Emu with him, he was replaced by Marty Morton who was also a co-producer. A duplicate Emu puppet was created so the puppet character could remain on the show.

Skeeter the Paperboy was played by James Kemsley. The character "Amos" Skeeter (Mosquito) went on to host Skeeter's Cartoon Corner until 1973 when Daryl Somers took over the host role. Kemsley later wrote and illustrated the newspaper comic strip Ginger Meggs. Other regular characters included Wing Ding (a human-sized chicken sponsoring a snack food from Arnott's), the Paddle Pop Lion (a human-sized lion sponsoring a brand of ice-cream from Streets), and Freddo Frog (a human-sized frog sponsoring a brand of chocolate for Cadbury).

Daily competitions included Miss Marilyn spinning a prize wheel. Contestants were rung by telephone. Live music was played by regular artists Marshall and his Portable Music Machine and Smoky Dawson. Between the live segments were cartoons and other, usually US-sourced, programming. Merchandise from the show included an LP record and a Milton Bradley board game.

In 1977, the program was decreed third of the three worst shows for children on Australian television by a group of Melbourne viewers polled by the Australian Broadcasting Control Board. The other two in this category were Get Smart and "Daryl and Ossie" (that is, Hey Hey it's Saturday).

Throughout the decade, Super Flying Fun Show competed with Breakfast-A-Go-Go in Sydney, Fredd Bear's Breakfast-A-Go-Go in Melbourne and, later Non Stop Cartoon Carnival and The Early Bird Show on ATV 0. Super Flying Fun Show ran until late 1979. It was replaced by cartoons until another show titled Today, a news and current affairs program, commenced on 28 June 1982.

It is not known if any of the episodes were kinescoped or if any videotapes were made, and it is possible that the series is lost. 

A similar show with the same title was also produced in Perth with host Dianna Hammond. In Adelaide, the Super Duper Flying Fun Show was hosted by Ric Marshall, Bozo the Clown and Joanne White.

References

Rod Hull - accessed January 2014
The Age - Television and Radio Guide (Green Guide) 1969-1980
TV Week magazine

Australian children's television series
Television shows set in Victoria (Australia)
1970 Australian television series debuts
1980 Australian television series endings
English-language television shows